The R189 road is a regional road in Ireland, linking Monaghan Town to Cootehill.

Route 
North to south the route starts at the N54 on the western edge of Monaghan Town.  It heads southwest for 15 km to its junction with the R183 in Newbliss.  It leaves Newbliss heading southeast for 10 km to its termination at the R188 two kilometers north of Cootehill, County Cavan.  It remains in County Monaghan for its full length.

See also 
 Roads in Ireland
 National primary road
 National secondary road

References 
 Roads Act 1993 (Classification of Regional Roads) Order 2006 – Department of Transport

Regional roads in the Republic of Ireland
Roads in County Monaghan